The duck mussel (Anodonta anatina) is a species of freshwater mussel, an aquatic bivalve mollusk in the family Unionidae, the river mussels.

Description
See Animalbase below (external link).

Distribution
The native distribution of this species is European-Siberian.
 Croatia
 Czech Republic - in Bohemia, in Moravia, least concern (LC)
 Germany
 Germany - (Arten der Vorwarnliste)
 Listed as specially protected species in annex 1 of the Bundesartenschutzverordnung.
 Great Britain
 Isle of Man - found at Lhen mouth (1922–25) and at Guilcagh (1985). Not protected by Wildlife Act 1990.
 Ireland -  found sporadically throughout the Shannon-Erne waterways and in Lough Neagh
 Netherlands - yes
 Russia
 Sverdlovsk oblast - yes
 Slovakia
 Sweden - it is the most widely distributed large freshwater bivalve in Sweden
 Spain
 Finland

References

External links

Anodonta anatina at Animalbase taxonomy, a short description (giving differences from Anodonta cygnea), distribution, biology, status (threats), images

Anodonta
Molluscs described in 1758
Taxa named by Carl Linnaeus